Wolfram Günther (born 27 June 1973 in Leipzig) is a German lawyer and politician (Alliance 90/The Greens). He is minister for energy, climate protection, environment and agriculture of Saxony. As well he is vice-minister-president of Saxony in the Black-Green-Red Second Kretschmer cabinet.

Life
From 1980 to 1990 Wolfram Günther was a swimmer and was second winner at GDR swim championship in 1986. 1992 Günther worked for Dresdner Bank in Düsseldorf and later in Leipzig. From 1994 to 1999 he studied law in Leipzig.

1994 Günther became member of Alliance 90/The Greens. 2014 he was elected to Saxony State parliament. In 2019 he became minister for energy, climate protection, environment and agriculture of Saxony.

References 

1973 births
Living people
Politicians from Leipzig